An inverted Red Triangle is the symbol for family planning health and contraception services, much as the red cross is a symbol for medical services. It is especially prevalent in many developing nations such as India, Ghana, Gambia, Zimbabwe, Egypt and Thailand, where it can be seen outside shops and clinics that offer family planning products, and as in commercial and government messages that promote reproductive health services and population control. It is frequently placed on contraceptive products, such as condoms, diaphragms, spermicidal gel, and IUDs (for instance, on the government-subsidized Nirodh condoms in India and Sultan condoms in Gambia).

Origins and variations
The red triangle was adopted  by Deep Tyagi Alias Dharmendra Tyagi Resident of Village Azamgarh urf Ratangarh Near block Noorpur of District Bijnor, an Indian family planning official and activist in the 1960s. Several variations on the basic symbol have since been developed, such as the "Life Choices" and "Family Planning: better life" logos used to promote birth control and reproductive health in Ghana, and the "Naissances Desirables" logo used in Zaire/Congo. The "Men Too" (shortened from "Family Planning is for Everybody ... Men Too") campaign in Australia used a hollow red triangle. The "Stop and think Minyawi : This is a very happy family, a light family" initiative in Egypt used calligraphic Arabic script to create the triangle.

See also
Birth control
Reproductive health

References

Further reading 

 "Population Dynamics: Causes and Consequences of World Demographic Change," Ralph Thomlinson, Random House, 1976.

External links
Ghana's Life Choices program

Birth control in India
Human gender and sexuality symbols